Alexandre Baud (8 August 1897 – 2 August 1932) was a French racing cyclist. He rode in the 1923 Tour de France.

References

1897 births
1932 deaths
French male cyclists
Place of birth missing
20th-century French people